Hernando Osorio (born 1953 in Ibagué, Colombia) is a painter and print-maker. Educated at the National University of Colombia, he was a member of the Awuyaka street art group. During his New York City period (1981-1985) he focused on etching and lithography. Since 1985 he has been living and working in Vienna, Austria. His preferred techniques are mixed-technique painting on canvas, woodcuts, and linocuts but he has also made paper, produced hand-bound books, and recently created a series of ceramic plate images. His work reflects his concern for wildlife, the role of the human being in nature, and traditions of folk art across the world. 

He is a member of Galerie Sur  and Q202.

His work is represented in the following collections:
 Victoria and Albert Museum, London
 Bibliothèque nationale de France, Paris
 The Library of Congress Print Collection, Washington D.C.
 Graphische Sammlung Albertina, Vienna, Austria
 The New York Public Library, New York, N.Y.
 Museo de Arte, Universidad Nacional de Colombia
 Museo Rayo, Roldanillo, Colombia
 Círculo de Periodistas de Bogotá
 The Printmaking Workshop, New York, N.Y.
 Palais de la Culture, Asilah, Morocco
 Collection of the Austrian Federal Ministry of Culture, Vienna, Austria
 Collection of the cultural department of the City of Vienna, Austria
 Collection of Silver Bow Art, Butte, MT 

and private collections in Argentina, Austria, Colombia, Spain, Japan, Mexico, Morocco, the UK, the United States, Venezuela.

References

External links 
 Hernando Osorio

1953 births
Living people
People from Ibagué
National University of Colombia alumni
Colombian painters
Colombian male painters
Colombian printmakers